British Army corporals Derek Wood and David Howes were killed by the Provisional IRA on 19 March 1988 in Belfast, Northern Ireland, in what became known as the corporals killings. The soldiers (wearing civilian clothes, both armed with Browning Hi-Power pistols and in a civilian car) drove into the funeral procession of an IRA member. Three days before, loyalist Michael Stone had attacked an IRA funeral and killed three people. Believing the soldiers were loyalists intent on repeating Stone's attack, dozens of people surrounded and attacked their car. During this, Corporal Wood drew his service pistol and fired a shot into the air. The soldiers were then dragged from the car and taken to a nearby sports ground where they were beaten, stripped and searched. They were then driven to a nearby waste ground where they were shot dead.

The incident was filmed by an overhead British Army helicopter and television news cameras; the images have been described by journalist Peter Taylor as some of the "most dramatic and harrowing" of the conflict in Northern Ireland.

Two men were sentenced to life imprisonment for murder, but were released in 1998 under the terms of the Good Friday Agreement. Several other men received lesser sentences for their part in the murders.

Background
The killings took place against a backdrop of violence at high-profile Irish republican funerals. The presence of large numbers of riot police and soldiers at IRA funerals was criticized for sparking unrest. On 6 March 1988, three unarmed IRA members alleged to have been preparing for a bomb attack on British military personnel were killed by the Special Air Service (SAS) in Gibraltar during Operation Flavius. Their joint funeral was due to be held in Belfast's Milltown Cemetery on 16 March. The security forces agreed to stay away from the funeral in exchange for guarantees that there would be no three-volley salute by IRA gunmen. A member of the Ulster Defence Association (UDA), Michael Stone, learned of this agreement. He attacked the funeral with pistols and grenades, killing three people and wounding more than sixty.

One of those killed was IRA member Caoimhín Mac Brádaigh. Mac Brádaigh's funeral, just three days after Stone's attack, took place amid an extremely tense atmosphere, and those attending feared another loyalist attack. Those attending the funeral included IRA members who acted as stewards.

Derek Tony Wood, aged 24, and David Robert Howes, aged 23, were corporals in the British Army's Royal Corps of Signals. According to the British Army, Wood and Howes ignored general orders to stay away from the area where the funeral was being held. It has been presumed that the two men drove into the procession by mistake. Howes had arrived in Northern Ireland one week before. Soldiers and police officers suggested that the corporals had gone "wandering", and that Wood was showing his newly arrived colleague the republican districts of Belfast. Former British soldier Seán Hartnett stated the corporals were members of a military surveillance unit known as the Joint Communications Unit (JCU).

Killings

Corporals Wood and Howes were wearing civilian clothes and driving in a silver Volkswagen Passat hatchback. The Mac Brádaigh funeral was making its way along the Andersonstown Road towards Milltown Cemetery when the corporals' car appeared from the opposite direction. The car drove straight towards the front of the funeral, which was headed by several black taxis. It drove past a Sinn Féin steward who had signalled it to turn. Mourners at the funeral said they believed they were under attack from Ulster loyalists. The car then mounted a pavement, scattering mourners, and turned into a small side road. When this road was blocked, it then reversed at speed, ending up within the funeral procession. Wood attempted to drive the car out of the procession but his exit route was blocked by a black taxi.

An angry crowd surrounded the car, smashed the windows and attempted to drag the soldiers out. Wood produced a Browning Hi-Power 9mm handgun, which each of the soldiers was armed with. Wood climbed partly out of a window and fired a shot in the air, which briefly scattered the crowd. The crowd then surged back, with some of them attacking the car with a wheel-brace and a stepladder snatched from a photographer. The men were eventually pulled from the car and punched and kicked to the ground.

The attack was witnessed by the media and passers-by. Journalist Mary Holland recalled seeing one of the men being dragged past a group of journalists: "He didn't cry out; just looked at us with terrified eyes, as though we were all enemies in a foreign country who wouldn't have understood what language he was speaking if he called out for help".

They were taken to nearby Casement Park sports ground, just opposite. Here they were beaten, stripped to their underpants and socks, and searched by a small group of men. The BBC and The Independent wrote that the men were "tortured". A search revealed that the men were British soldiers. Their captors found a military ID on Howes which was marked "Herford", the site of a British military base in Germany, but it is believed they misread it as "Hereford", the headquarters of the SAS.

Redemptorist priest Father Alec Reid, who played a significant part in the peace process leading to the 1998 Good Friday Agreement, intervened and attempted to save the soldiers, and asked people to call an ambulance.I got down between the two of them and I had my arm around this one and I was holding this one up by the shoulder.... They were so disciplined, they just lay there totally still and I decided to myself they were soldiers. There was a helicopter circling overhead and I don't know why they didn't do something, radio to the police or soldiers to come up, because there were these two of their own soldiers.

One of the captors warned Reid not to interfere and ordered two men to take him away.

There they were taken out of the vehicle and shot dead. Wood was shot six times: twice in the head and four times in the chest. He had also been stabbed four times in the back of the neck. Howes was shot five times: once in the head and four times in the body. Each also had multiple injuries to other parts of their bodies. The perpetrators quickly left the scene. Reid heard the shots and rushed to the waste ground. He believed one of the soldiers was still breathing and attempted to give him mouth-to-mouth resuscitation. Upon realizing that the soldiers were dead, he gave them the last rites. According to photographer David Cairns, although photographers were having their films taken by the IRA, he was able to keep his by quickly leaving the area after taking a photograph of Reid kneeling beside the almost naked body of Howes, administering the last rites. Cairns' photograph was later named one of the best pictures of the past 50 years by Life magazine.

The whole incident was filmed by a British Army helicopter hovering overhead. An unnamed soldier of the Royal Scots said his eight-man patrol was nearby and saw the attack on the corporals' car, but were told not to intervene. Soldiers and police arrived on the scene three minutes after the corporals had been shot. A British Army spokesman said the army did not respond immediately because they needed time to assess the situation and were wary of being ambushed by the IRA. The large funeral procession also prevented them getting to the scene quickly.

Shortly after, the IRA released a statement:
The Belfast brigade, IRA, claims responsibility for the execution of two SAS members who launched an attack on the funeral cortege of our comrade volunteer Kevin Brady. The SAS unit was initially apprehended by the people lining the route in the belief that armed loyalists were attacking them and they were removed from the immediate vicinity. Our volunteers forcibly removed the two men from the crowd and, after clearly ascertaining their identities from equipment and documentation, we executed them.

Aftermath
Northern Ireland Secretary Tom King acknowledged that the Milltown Cemetery attack and the killing of Wood and Howes were "wholly unacceptable and do require immediate review in regard to policing to be followed at any future funeral." Conservative MP Michael Mates nonetheless defended the "hands off" policy, saying "A return to heavy-handed policing could provoke riots, which is what the IRA want so they can say to the world 'They won't even let us bury our dead in peace.'" Fine Gael leader Alan Dukes, Labour leader Dick Spring and Taoiseach Charlie Haughey all condemned the killings. The British prime minister at the time, Margaret Thatcher, called the killings "an act of appalling savagery".

On 2 August 1988, Lance Corporal Roy Butler of the Ulster Defence Regiment was shot and killed in Belfast with one of the guns taken from the corporals.

Two men, Alex Murphy and Harry Maguire, were found guilty of the murder of the corporals. They were jailed for life in 1989, with a recommendation of a minimum 25 years. Murphy received a further 83 years, and Maguire 79 years, for bodily harm, falsely imprisoning the soldiers, and possessing a gun and ammunition. Sir Brian Hutton, sentencing, said 

Both men had been listed as senior members of the IRA's Belfast Brigade. In 1973, at the age of 15, Murphy had been the youngest republican internee in Long Kesh prison, which later became known as the Maze. Maguire became a member of the IRA's "camp staff" in the Maze, one of the senior IRA men effectively in control of the republican wings, and met Northern Ireland Secretary Mo Mowlam when she visited the jail to negotiate with prisoners. In November 1998, Murphy and Maguire were released from the Maze prison as part of the early prisoner release scheme under the Good Friday Agreement. Maguire is now chairman of the Belfast office of Community Restorative Justice Ireland, a police-supported group aimed at dealing with low-level crime through mediation and intended to replace the practice of "punishment beatings" and kneecappings by paramilitaries.

A further three men were in 1990 found guilty by common purpose of aiding and abetting the murder. The men (Pat Kane, Mickey Timmons, and Seán Ó Ceallaigh) were dubbed the "Casement Three" by republicans who disputed the validity of their convictions. Kane's conviction was quashed on appeal due to the unreliability of his confession. Ó Ceallaigh was released in 1998 under the Good Friday Agreement.

Terence Clarke, the chief steward on the day, was sentenced to seven years' imprisonment for assaulting Wood. Clarke had served as Gerry Adams' bodyguard; he died of cancer in 2000.

In March 2018, BBC Two aired the Vanessa Engle documentary, The Funeral Murders, which included eyewitness testimonies of the events of that day.

See also
1971 Scottish soldiers' killings
Milltown Cemetery attack
Lynching

References

Sources

1980s in County Antrim
1988 in military history
1988 in Northern Ireland
1988 murders in the United Kingdom
British Army in Operation Banner
Deaths by firearm in Northern Ireland
Filmed killings
March 1988 crimes
March 1988 events in the United Kingdom
Military actions and engagements during the Troubles (Northern Ireland)
Murder in Belfast
Lynching
People killed by the Provisional Irish Republican Army
Royal Corps of Signals
Terrorist incidents in Belfast
Terrorist incidents in the United Kingdom in 1988
1980s murders in Northern Ireland
1988 crimes in Ireland
The Troubles in Belfast